Live in Paris '19 is the first in a trio of benefit live albums by Australian psychedelic rock band King Gizzard & the Lizard Wizard, which was released digitally to Bandcamp on 10 January 2020.  It was released simultaneously with one other live album, Live in Adelaide '19. The third album Live in Brussels '19 was then released five days later. The album debuted at number nine on the ARIA Albums Chart.

Background 
The album features a set by the band performed at the Olympia in Paris on 14 October 2019.  The tracks span seven of the band’s albums: Polygondwanaland, Flying Microtonal Banana, Infest the Rats' Nest, Gumboot Soup, Nonagon Infinity, I'm in Your Mind Fuzz, and Fishing for Fishies.

All of the proceeds have gone to Wildlife Victoria.

Track listing

Personnel 
Credits for Live in Paris '19 adapted from Bandcamp.

Michael Cavanagh – drums
Cook Craig – guitar, keyboards
Lucas Harwood (Skinner) – bass guitar
Ambrose Kenny-Smith – harmonica, vocals, keyboards, percussion
Stu Mackenzie – vocals, guitar, keyboards, mixing
Eric Moore – drums
Joey Walker – guitar, vocals

Additional personnel
 Gaspard De Meulemeester – live recording
 Sam Joseph – live recording
 Stacey Wilson – live recording
 Jason Galea – cover design

Charts

See also
List of 2020 albums

References

2020 live albums
King Gizzard & the Lizard Wizard live albums